The Stealth is considered the ninth novel of Sonallah Ibrahim's novels, and he is considered one of the literature stars of sixties. This novel was published in 2007 in Cairo, Arab Future House. The writer covers issues that filled his mind and formed his concerns.

Plot 
Sonallah Ibrahim portrayed us in this novel, Egypt in 1948 AD, the events of this novel revolve around the story of the young son who tells everything around him and his father who takes care of him. When he was five years old, and he explains to us in the smallest details of what he saw and heard, his eyes are observing, and piercing the smallest things, he lurks and kidnaps scenes and minute details to store in his subconscious mind, the child monitors everything that was going on around him, the movements of people and their privacy, the classes of his school and the habits of the street, market and squares The public and mosques in his time, with an attractive and detailed description that makes you travel in his time and live his moments.

The habit of voyeurism is the habit of the child, and it is something that the father does not realize in the novel due to the young age of his “voyeur” son, especially when the father takes the son with him wherever he goes. The child witnesses all the father's conversations with some people about politics, art, literature, women and the social situation in Egypt during wartime.

This novel focuses on many important topics, and perhaps the most important of them is the political topics, as the political topic in this novel clarifies the course of that time, in terms of the monarchy in that period and their immersion in the pleasures of life while the people were starving and Palestine has been lost since that period, in the times of domination British and French customs and traditions in Arab countries.

Through his novel, "The Voyeur," Sanalla Ibrahim shows us the bitter truths about society and government, which are full of hypocrisy, falsehood, and deception on the part of an innocent child.

See also 
 Sharaf (novel)

References 

2007 novels
Arabic-language novels
Egyptian novels